Douglas Stewart McNichol (March 29, 1930 – February 15, 2012) was a professional Canadian football player with the Canadian Football League's Montreal Alouettes and the Toronto Argonauts. After playing college football at the University of Western Ontario, McNichol was drafted first overall by the Alouettes in the first ever Canadian College Draft in 1953 and spent his entire 11-year CFL career as a defensive lineman. McNichol won East All-Star honours in 1953, 1954, 1955, 1958 and 1959.

He played for the Bramalea Satellites Ontario Rugby Football Union intermediate team in 1967.

References

1930 births
2012 deaths
Players of Canadian football from Ontario
Canadian football defensive linemen
Montreal Alouettes players
Toronto Argonauts players
Western Mustangs football players
Sportspeople from St. Catharines
Ontario Rugby Football Union players